Bow is an English surname.  It is also a given name.

People with the name include:

Surname 
Robert Henry Bow (1827–1909), Scottish civil engineer and photographer
Richard Bow (1868–1941), Australian politician from Queensland
Lily Lawrence Bow (1870–1943), American librarian, namesake of the Lily Lawrence Bow Library
Malcolm Ross Bow (1887–1982), Canadian public health officer
Warren E. Bow (1891–1945), American educator
Frank T. Bow (1901–1972), American politician and jurist from Ohio
Clara Bow (1905–1965), American actress
Malcolm Norman Bow (1918–2005), Canadian diplomat
Glen Bow (1935–2006), Australian rules footballer 
Buddy Red Bow (1948–1993), American Lakota musician
Erin Bow (born 1971), Canadian writer
Sharyn Bow (born 1971), Australian cricket player
Ryan Bow (born 1979), American mixed martial arts fighter
Landon Bow (born 1995), Canadian professional ice hockey goaltender
William Bow (1878–1929), Scottish footballer

Given name 
Bow Kum (1888–1909), Chinese girl murdered in New York City
Bow Ditama, Japanese manga artist
Bow Thayer, American singer-songwriter

Fictional characters
 Bow (Masters of the Universe), a character from the cartoon She-Ra: Princess of Power
 Rainbow "Bow" Johnson, a character from the sitcoms Black-ish and Mixed-ish
Laura Bow, a lady in Laura Bow and Laura Bow 2

English-language surnames